Hong Yong-Jo (born 22 May 1982) is a North Korean former international forward. He played for FC Rostov in Russia and FK Bežanija in the Serbian SuperLiga.

He captained the North Korean team that qualified for the 2010 FIFA World Cup in South Africa.

Club career
After playing many years with April 25 SC, he moved to Serbia in early 2008 to play with FK Bežanija in the Serbian SuperLiga. In late 2008, he signed with Russian FC Rostov where he will play three seasons, the two last in the Russian Premier League.

Club statistics

International career

Hong Yong-Jo plays for the North Korean national team since 2002. He became one of the most important players, and was the team captain at the 2010 FIFA World Cup.

International goals

References

External links

 FC Rostov Profile  
 Statistics at Statbox.ru 
 Stats from Serbia at Srbijafudbal 

1982 births
Living people
Sportspeople from Pyongyang
North Korean footballers
North Korean expatriate footballers
North Korean expatriate sportspeople in Russia
North Korean expatriate sportspeople in Serbia
North Korea international footballers
2010 FIFA World Cup players
2011 AFC Asian Cup players
April 25 Sports Club players
FK Bežanija players
Serbian SuperLiga players
Expatriate footballers in Serbia
FC Rostov players
Russian Premier League players
Expatriate footballers in Russia
Association football forwards
Association football midfielders
Footballers at the 2002 Asian Games
Footballers at the 2006 Asian Games
Asian Games competitors for North Korea